The Secretariat of Infrastructure, Communications and Transportation (Secretaría de Infraestructura, Comunicaciones y Transportes, SICT) of Mexico is the national federal entity that regulates commercial road traffic and broadcasting. Its headquarters are in the Torre Libertad on Reforma in Mexico City but some aspects of the department still function at the old headquarters located at the intersection of Eje Central and Eje 4 Sur (Xola).  The building is decorated with murals created by arranging small colored stones on the building's outer walls.

Historical nomenclature

The forerunner of the modern-day SCT was created in 1891 under President Porfirio Díaz and was known as the Secretariat of Communications (Secretaría de Comunicaciones); its first incumbent as secretary was Manuel González Cosío. In 1920 it was renamed to the Secretariat of Communications and Public Works (Secretaría de Comunicaciones y Obras Públicas; "SCOP"). In 1959, it changed names to Secretariat of Communications and Transportation, and finally, in 2019, it added Infrastructure to its name, to encompass and highlight one of its sub-organs, the Subsecretaría de Infraestructura..

Secretaries of Communications and Transport
The SCT is headed by the Secretary of Communications and Transport, a member of the federal executive cabinet. Under the 1917 Constitution, this position has been held by the following individuals:

Under President Venustiano Carranza (1917–1920)
 1917–1920: Manuel Rodríguez Gutiérrez
Under President Adolfo de la Huerta (1920)
 1920: Pascual Ortiz Rubio
Under President Álvaro Obregón (1920–1924)
 1920–1921: Pascual Ortiz Rubio
 1921–1924: Amado Aguirre
Under President Plutarco Elías Calles (1924–1928)
 1924–1925: Adalberto Tejeda
 1925–1926: Eduardo Ortiz
 1926–1928: Ramón Ross
Under President Emilio Portes Gil (1928–1930)
 1928–1930: Javier Sánchez Mejorada
Under President Pascual Ortiz Rubio (1930–1932)
 1930–1931: Juan Andrew Almazán
 1931–1932: Gustavo P. Serrano
 1932: Miguel M. Acosta Guajardo
Under President Abelardo L. Rodríguez (1932–1934)
 1932–1934: Miguel M. Acosta Guajardo
Under President Lázaro Cárdenas del Río (1934–1940)
 1934–1935: Rodolfo Elías Calles
 1935–1939: Francisco J. Múgica
 1939–1940: Melquiades Angulo
Under President Manuel Ávila Camacho (1940–1946)
 1940–1941: Jesús de la Garza
 1941–1945: Maximino Ávila Camacho
 1945–1946: Pedro Martínez Tornel
Under President Miguel Alemán (1946–1952)
 1946–1952: Agustín García López
Under President Adolfo Ruiz Cortines (1952–1958)
 1952–1955: Carlos Lazo
 1955–1958: Walter Cross Buchanan
Under President Adolfo López Mateos (1958–1964)
 1958–1964: Walter Cross Buchanan
Under President Gustavo Díaz Ordaz (1964–1970)
 1964–1970: José Antonio Padilla Segura
Under President Luis Echeverría Álvarez (1970–1976)
 1970–1976: Eugenio Méndez Docurro
Under President José López Portillo (1976–1982)
 1976–1982: Emilio Mújica Montoya
 Under President Miguel de la Madrid (1982–1988)
 1982–1984: Rodolfo Félix Valdés
 1984–1988: Daniel Díaz Díaz
 Under President Carlos Salinas de Gortari (1988–1994)
 1988–1992: Andrés Caso Lombardo
 1992–1994: Emilio Gamboa Patrón
 Under President Ernesto Zedillo (1994–2000)
 1994: Guillermo Ortiz Martínez
 1994–2000: Carlos Ruiz Sacristán
 Under President Vicente Fox (2000–2006)
 2000–2006: Pedro Cerisola y Weber
 Under President Felipe Calderón (2006–2012)
 2006–2009: Luis Téllez
 2009–2011: Juan Molinar Horcasitas
 2011–2012: Dionisio Pérez-Jácome Friscione
 Under President Enrique Peña Nieto (2012–2018)
 2012–2018: Gerardo Ruiz Esparza
 Under President Andrés Manuel López Obrador (2018–present)
 2018–2020: Javier Jiménez Espriú
 2020–present: Jorge Arganis Díaz Leal

Agencies of the SCT
The Direction General of Civil Aeronautics is the agency under the SCT that regulates aviation.

The Rail Transportation Regulatory Agency (ARTF) is the agency under the SCT that regulates railroads."

See also

Palace of the Secretariat of Communications and Public Works, former Secretariat building in downtown Mexico City

References

External links
 Ministry of Communications and Transportation
 Ministry of Communications and Transportation  (Mobile)
 Ministry of Communications and Transportation (Archive)

Cabinet of Mexico
Mexico
Mexico
Transportation organizations based in Mexico
Infrastructure